Jalan Sri Aman, or Jalan Akses Sri Aman, Federal Route 2105, is a federal road in Sri Aman Division, Sarawak, Malaysia. It is also a main route to Sri Aman town from Pan Borneo Highway.

List of junctions

Malaysian Federal Roads